"You Made Me That Way" is a song written by David Malloy and Gary Burr, and recorded by American country music artist Andy Griggs.  It was released in September 2000 as the fifth and final single from the album You Won't Ever Be Lonely.  The song reached number 19 on the Billboard Hot Country Singles & Tracks chart.

Chart performance

Notes

References

2001 singles
1999 songs
Andy Griggs songs
Songs written by Gary Burr
Songs written by David Malloy
Song recordings produced by David Malloy
RCA Records singles